The following is a list of results of the United States men's basketball team at the Summer Olympics:

References
General
 "USA Men's Olympic Team History" from USA Basketball

Specific

External links
 USABasketball.com
 Olympic preview at NBA.com

Basketball statistics
United States at the Olympic men's basketball tournament
Results Of The United States Men's Basketball Team
Olympic